Nikita Andreyev (born 1988) is a Russian football player

Nikita Andreyev may also refer to:

 Nikita Andreyev (footballer, born March 1997), Russian football player, forward, started his career with Shinnik Yaroslavl
 Nikita Andreyev (footballer, born November 1997), Russian football player, midfielder, started his career with Zenit St. Petersburg
 Nikita Andreev (freestyle skier), Russian skier